James Ryan is a South African actor, writer and director.

Career
Ryan garnered international attention early in his career, starring in the 1976 film Kill or Be Killed. Ryan appeared as a martial arts fighter in the alternate world film. He reprised the role five years later in Kill and Kill Again, starring alongside Miss World winner Anneline Kriel. The sequel proved a major box office success for a low-budget South African feature, reaching No. 2 on the American box office and grossing $802,900 after two weeks in American theatres.

In 1984, he had the title role in Go for the Gold which also starred Tamara Franke and Cameron Mitchell. He played the part of a long distance runner called Johnny who lived at home with his mother and abusive stepfather. Two things that mean a lot to him are his girlfriend Trish and his running. He has a solid influence in his champion runner friend Victor (played by M'zwandile Ngxangane). He comes to the attention of Phillip Pritchard, who is a businessman. He risks losing the things that are dear to him, as Pritchard is forcing him to choose between them and fame and fortune.

In 1989, he starred in Space Mutiny, a South African science fiction/action film, again with Mitchell. A year later, he appeared alongside Susan Sarandon and Harvey Keitel in The January Man. In 1991, he wrote and starred in The Last Hero.

In 1994, he landed a role in Halifax f.p, an Australian television drama that won two Australian Film Institute awards. A year later he returned to the martial arts film genre, with a role in Redemption: Kickboxer 5.

In 1998, he appeared in the Australian television drama and sequel Halifax f.p: Afraid of the Dark; the acclaimed drama earned several Logie and Australian Film Institute nominations.

In 1999, he appeared in the sequel to From Dusk Till Dawn, From Dusk Till Dawn 2: Texas Blood Money.
Since then, he has appeared in films such as Red Lipstick, Global Effect and Sterne über Madeira, a German television two-part drama alongside fellow South African Moira Lister.

Selected filmography
 La Diosa virgen (1973)
 Kill or Be Killed (1976)
 Kill and Kill Again (1981)
 Go for the Gold (1984)
 Falling in Love (1984)
 Space Mutiny (1988)
 Any Man's Death (1990)
 The January Man (1990)
 Redemption: Kickboxer 5 (1995)
 From Dusk Till Dawn 2: Texas Blood Money (1999)
 Samson (2018)

References

External links

Living people
1952 births
South African male film actors
White South African people